Narthecium is a Eurasian and North American genus of herbaceous flowering plants. This genus was traditionally treated as belonging to the family Liliaceae, but the APG II system of 2003 placed it in the family Nartheciaceae.

The global distribution of the genus is widely disjunct, with species in Europe, Southwest Asia, Japan, the East Coast of the United States, and the West Coast of the United States.  Narthecium americanum is a candidate for listing under the federal Endangered Species Act in the United States.

Species
Narthecium americanum Ker Gawl. – Eastern United States (†North and †South Carolina, Maryland, †Delaware, New Jersey)
Narthecium asiaticum Maxim. – Japan
Narthecium balansae Briq. – Turkey, Caucasus
Narthecium californicum Baker – mountains of northern + central California, southwestern Oregon
Narthecium ossifragum (L.) Huds. – Scandinavia (including Faeroe Islands), British Isles, France, Spain, Portugal, Germany, Netherlands, Belgium
Narthecium reverchonii Celak. – Corsica
Narthecium scardicum Košanin – Greece, Albania, Yugoslavia

References

Nartheciaceae
Dioscoreales genera